"Room on the 3rd Floor" is a song by English pop rock band McFly. It was released on 15 November 2004 as the fourth and final single from their debut studio album of the same name (2004). The song debuted at number five in the UK Singles Chart and peaked at number 27 in Ireland. The song also appears as a B-side for the band's next single, "All About You/You've Got a Friend".

Background
"Room on the 3rd Floor" was written by band members Tom Fletcher and Danny Jones. The song is less upbeat and uptempo than their previous singles. It was written during Fletcher and Jones' two-month stay at the InterContinental London (Room 363), which they found a little tedious; they began listening in to arguments in the neighbouring rooms, and wrote about a rather annoying room-service maid, all of which are mentioned on the track.

Music video
The video depicts the band as small plastic models (based on Tamiya models). During the shoot, the band were painted blue ("Like a smurf"- Danny) and then digitally enhanced to make them look like plastic. McFly can be seen in full colour playing on the packaging box; the McFly Set with Roadie and Fans is a nod to their then upcoming tour.

Track listings
UK CD1 and 7-inch picture disc
 "Room on the 3rd Floor"
 "Crazy Little Thing Called Love"

UK CD2
 "Room on the 3rd Floor"
 "5 Colours in Her Hair" (live)
 "Deck the Halls"
 "Room on the 3rd Floor" (live)
 "Room on the 3rd Floor" (video)

UK DVD single
 "Room on the 3rd Floor" (audio)
 "Obviously" (video)
 "McFly Home Movie" (Part 2)
 "Guitar Lessons with Tom and Danny"

Personnel
Personnel are adapted from the UK CD2 liner notes.

 Tom Fletcher – writing, guitar
 Danny Jones – writing, guitar
 Dougie Poynter – bass guitar
 Harry Judd – drums
 Hugh Padgham – production, mixing

 Jay Reynolds – engineering, Pro Tools
 Raj Das – assistant engineering
 Richard Woodcraft – assistant engineering
 Andy Saunders – assistant engineering

Charts

References

2004 singles
2004 songs
Island Records singles
McFly songs
Song recordings produced by Hugh Padgham
Songs written by Danny Jones
Songs written by Tom Fletcher
Universal Records singles

de:McFly
Room on the 3rd Floor
sv:McFly